The Autonomist Movement was a Chilean political movement which was a founding member of the Broad Front on 21 January 2017. One year later, the movement merged into the party Social Convergence alongside Libertarian Left, Socialism and Liberty and New Democracy.

Notable members
 Gabriel Boric
 Constanza Schönhaut
 Jorge Sharp

References

External links
 Autonomist Movement news at CNN Chile

Autonomism
Chilean political movements